The Plant System named after its owner, Henry B. Plant, was a system of railroads and steamboats in the U.S. South, taken over by the Atlantic Coast Line Railroad in 1902. The original line of the system was the Savannah, Florida and Western Railway, running across southern Georgia. The Plant Investment Company was formed in 1882 to lease and buy other railroads and expand the system. Other major lines incorporated into the system include the Savannah and Charleston Railroad and the Brunswick and Western Railroad.

History
The Atlantic and Gulf Railroad went bankrupt on January 1, 1877, and Henry Plant bought it on November 4, 1879, reorganizing it as the Savannah, Florida and Western Railway on December 9.

Plant bought the Savannah and Charleston Railroad (opened 1860) in 1880, reorganizing it as the Charleston and Savannah Railway. That acquisition extended the line from Savannah northeast to Charleston, South Carolina, where the Ashley River Railroad (operated by the C&S) connected to the Northeastern Railroad (later part of the Atlantic Coast Line Railroad main line).

The Waycross and Florida Railroad and East Florida Railway were chartered in February 1880, forming the Georgia and Florida parts of the "Waycross Short Line". That line, running from the main line at Waycross southeast to Jacksonville, Florida, opened in April 1881.

In 1882, the Chattahoochee Branch opened from Climax on the main line southwest to the Florida state line, where the Chattahoochee and East Pass Railroad (chartered 1881) continued to River Junction, Florida, a hamlet which later came to be known as Chattahoochee, Florida. At River Junction, the Louisville and Nashville Railroad's Pensacola and Atlantic Railroad continued west, and the Florida Central and Western Railroad ran east to Jacksonville.

The Live Oak and Rowland's Bluff Railroad and Live Oak, Tampa and Charlotte Harbor Railroad were chartered in 1881 to continue the short Florida Branch south from Live Oak further into Florida (eventually reaching Gainesville with a branch to Lake City). Plant tried to acquire the  narrow gauge Florida Southern Railway to continue this line, but was unsuccessful, and on May 4, 1883, he bought 3/5 of the stock of the  narrow gauge South Florida Railroad. At the time, the only connection between this system, with a main line from Sanford west to Tampa, was via steamboats on the St. Johns River from Jacksonville to Sanford.

The Plant Investment Company was formed in 1882 to lease and buy other railroads and expand the system.

The various lines of the SF&W were consolidated into one company in 1884. Specifically, the following companies lost their corporate existence:
Waycross and Florida Railroad and East Florida Railway (Waycross Short Line)
Chattahoochee and East Pass Railroad (Chattahoochee Branch)
Live Oak and Rowland's Bluff Railroad and Live Oak, Tampa and Charlotte Harbor Railroad (Florida Division)

The Brunswick and Western Railroad, opened in the late 1850s as the Brunswick and Florida Railroad, was bought by Plant in 1884.

Expansion into Alabama and central Florida
In 1887 the Green Pond, Walterboro and Branchville Railway opened as a short branch of the main line to Walterboro, South Carolina. The Walterborough and Western Railroad continued that line to Ehrhardt in 1896, and the two were merged into the Green Pond, Walterboro and Branchville Railroad in 1900.

On May 30, 1887, Florida state law chapter 3794 was approved, authorizing the SF&W to build lines from Tallahassee and Monticello north to the Georgia state line, connecting to branches from Thomasville, Georgia. The Tallahassee Branch was never built, but the Monticello Branch opened in 1888.

Plant obtained a controlling interest in the Alabama Midland Railway in July 1890. That line continued the main line from Bainbridge west to Montgomery, Alabama. The Southwestern Alabama Railway and Abbeville Southern Railway, two branches of that line, were acquired in the 1890s.

In 1890, the  narrow gauge Florida Southern Railway went into receivership and remained so for two years. In 1892, Plant bought the Florida Southern Railway under foreclosure and reorganized it as the Florida Southern Railroad. At this time, the Florida Southern system stretched from the south end of the Plant System at Gainesville south via Ocala, using trackage rights over the South Florida Railroad's Pemberton Ferry Branch, to Punta Gorda. The Florida Southern Railroad was integrated with the rest of the Plant System in 1896 and was converted to  that same year.

The Silver Springs, Ocala and Gulf Railroad was chartered in 1877 and opened in 1892, running from Ocala west to Dunnellon and then south to Homosassa and Inverness. A connection was built from Inverness to the South Florida Railroad at Pemberton Ferry.

The Winston and Bone Valley Railroad, opened in 1892 to serve phosphate mines near Lakeland, became part of the Plant System in 1896.

The Tampa and Thonotosassa Railroad was incorporated in 1893, running northeast from the South Florida Railroad in Tampa to the small town of Thonotosassa.

In 1895, Plant bought the  narrow gauge Sanford and St. Petersburg Railroad (previously the Orange Belt Railway) in 1895, which stretched across the state from Sanford to St. Petersburg. The  Florida Midland Railway in the Orlando area was acquired in 1896, its line north of the Sanford and St. Petersburg Railroad was abandoned, and its remaining track from Sanford to Kissimmee was converted to  narrow gauge. By keeping these two connecting lines the same narrow gauge, they were able to work in conjunction with one another, utilizing the same narrow gauge equipment from both the Sanford and St. Petersburg Railroad and the recently converted Florida Southern Railroad.

In 1899, the Jacksonville, Tampa and Key West Railway, except for the branch to Titusville (which had been sold to the Florida East Coast Railway), was reorganized and bought by Plant as the Jacksonville and St. Johns River Railway. This supplied a connection between Jacksonville and Sanford without the need for a steamboat transfer at each end, as well as system connections at Tavares and Palatka.

The Plant System built the nearly straight  Folkston Cutoff in southeast Georgia in 1901. This ran from the old Waycross and Florida Railroad at Folkston north via Nahunta to Jesup on the SF&W mainline, allowing trains to bypass Waycross and save  over the old route.

In 1901, the Green Pond, Walterboro and Branchville Railroad, the Ashley River Railroad, the Abbeville Southern Railway; and Southern Alabama Railroad were all consolidated into the Savannah, Florida and Western Railway.

In 1901, the following companies were also merged into the SF&W:
Alabama Midland Railway
Brunswick and Western Railroad
Charleston and Savannah Railway

In 1902 the Atlantic Coast Line Railroad acquired the entire Plant System, connecting at Charleston, SC. The components were soon merged into the ACL. The system has since become part of CSX after several mergers.

Station listing

Main Line (Savannah, Florida and Western Railway)

Florida Division

Chattahoochee Branch

Monticello Branch

Steamship Lines
Associated with the railroad were the Plant Steamship Line and Canada Atlantic and Plant Steamship Co., Ltd., both with Henry B. Plant as chief officer. The Tampa, Florida-based steamships served Cuba by way of Key West, Mobile, Alabama, and two local routes. The Canada Atlantic and Plant Steamship Co., Ltd., with no direct company terminal as at Tampa, served Boston and Canadian points at Halifax, Cape Breton and Prince Edward Island. Advertising touted "Plant Steamship Line — Ships ply between the ports of 3 great nations: United States (Port Tampa, Key West, Mobile, Boston), England (Dominion of Canada), Spain (Cuba)."

References

Railroad History Database
Confederate Railroads
Mileposts from CSX Transportation Timetables

Further reading

External links
Georgia's Railroad History and Heritage - Plant System
Confederate Railroads - Savannah, Albany & Gulf Railroad
Confederate Railroads - Atlantic & Gulf Railroad
Stokes Collection of Florida Plant Railway Photographs at the University of South Florida
Plant Railway System Papers at the University of South Florida
 Glover, F. H.  "Henry B. Plant - Genius of the West Coast", originally published in Sunland:  The Magazine of Florida, February 1925.
Traveler's Official Railway Guide for the United States, Canada and Mexico, July 1897 — pages 794-804 showing route map, corporate officers and schedules to include steamship lines

Predecessors of the Atlantic Coast Line Railroad
Defunct Alabama railroads
Defunct Florida railroads
Defunct Georgia (U.S. state) railroads
Defunct South Carolina railroads
Railway companies established in 1894
Railway companies disestablished in 1902
3 ft gauge railways in the United States
5 ft gauge railways in the United States
1881 establishments in the United States